Parliamentary elections were held in Equatorial Guinea on 21 November 1993. They were the first multi-party elections in the country since the pre-independence elections of 1968. Although seven parties were allowed to run in the election, the ruling Democratic Party of Equatorial Guinea (PDGE) maintained its grip on power, winning 68 of the 80 seats in the enlarged Chamber of People's Representatives. According to official figures, voter turnout was 67%. The Joint Opposition Platform, an alliance of eight opposition parties, called for a boycott and claimed voter turnout was as low as 20%.  

The alliance's leaders were prevented from travelling to the mainland to campaign for the boycott and some were banned from leaving the country. Following the election, the Spanish Foreign Minister Javier Solana claimed the elections were not free and fair, an opinion shared by other observers.

Results

There was a difference of one vote between the party totals and the official number of valid votes (78,224).

References

Equatorial Guinea
1993 in Equatorial Guinea
Elections in Equatorial Guinea